Mount Carnes is a peak  east of Saint Pauls Mountain in the Asgard Range, Victoria Land. It was named by the Advisory Committee on Antarctic Names for Philip A. Carnes, engineering and construction manager for Antarctic Support Services, who supervised construction and maintenance performed at the United States Antarctic Research Program at South Pole Station, Siple Station and McMurdo Station for three seasons, 1973–76.

References 

Mountains of the Asgard Range
McMurdo Dry Valleys